A Still Heart is the second compilation album from New Zealand electronic music band The Naked and Famous.  The album was released on 2 March 2018 in Australia and New Zealand, and 9 March in the United States. It features acoustic performances of several of the songs from previous studio albums.

Background 
After touring in support of Simple Forms, their third studio album, the ensemble returned to Los Angeles to begin an acoustic project. In September 2017, the ensemble released the title track "A Still Heart", a portmanteau of songs "A Stillness" and "Hearts Like Ours". "Punching in a Dream" was released at the end of 2017. In February 2018, the band announced the release date for the compilation.

Track listing

Personnel 
Credits adapted from digital booklet.
 Ken Andrews – mixing
 Bradley Hale – artwork
 Joel Kefali – artwork
 Joe LaPorta – mastering
 The Naked and Famous – producer, performer
 Thomas Powers – producer

Release history

References

2018 compilation albums
The Naked and Famous albums